Events from the year 1590 in the Kingdom of Scotland.

Incumbents
Monarch – James VI

Events
 17 May – Anne of Denmark crowned queen consort of Scotland at Holyrood Abbey
 October – Battle of Clynetradwell: the forces of Alexander Gordon, Earl of Sutherland (chief of Clan Sutherland) force those of George Sinclair, Earl of Caithness (chief of Clan Sinclair) to retreat
North Berwick witch trials begin
Glenbuchat Castle built for John Gordon of Cairnbarrow
The oldest known paper mill in Scotland is recorded as operating at Dalry.

Births
22 March – George Gordon, 2nd Marquess of Huntly, nobleman (died 1649)
27 April – Andrew Cant, Presbyterian minister and Covenanter (died 1663)
May – George Jamesone, portrait painter (died 1644)
James Roberton, advocate and judge (died 1664)

Deaths
 3 January – Robert Boyd, 5th Lord Boyd (born c.1517)

The arts
 March – English printer Robert Waldegrave establishes himself in Edinburgh
John Burrell writes The Description of the Queenis Maiesties most honourable entry into the town of Edinburgh

See also
 Timeline of Scottish history

References